The Military History of Denmark is centered around an involvement in wars in Northern Europe since 793 and, recently, elsewhere. 

In the early Middle Ages, Danish Vikings invaded and conquered parts of the British Isles and Normandy. Later in the Middle Ages, Denmark was repeatedly in combat with Scandinavian neighbours and in the Baltic area. The "Union Wars" of the 15th and early 16th centuries took place between Denmark and Sweden, then united in the Kalmar Union. After Sweden broke away, Denmarkuntil 1814 remaining united with Norwayagain confronted Sweden in the Northern Seven Years' War (1563–70) and the Kalmar War (1611–13). Denmark was heavily involved in the Thirty Years' War (1618–1648) on the side of the Protestants of the German lands. During the 16th to 18th centuries, Danish military involvement was also directed against Russia and other Eastern European nations in the series of Northern Wars and subsequent campaigns.

Denmark was brought into the Napoleonic Wars on the French side when attacked by Britain at the Battles of Copenhagen in 1801 and 1807. The eventual defeat of Napoleon led to the break-up of the Denmark-Norway union. The next major combats were over control of Schleswig, in the First and Second Schleswig Wars. The result hereof being that Denmark lost Schleswig, of which the northern part returned in 1920. Denmark remained neutral in World War I, but in World War II the country was occupied, with little fighting, by Nazi Germany in 1940.

As a member of the United Nations and NATO, Denmark has participated in military operations since 1992: in Bosnia, Afghanistan, Iraq and Libya.

The Viking Age (793–1050)

793 – Vikings raid Lindisfarne monastery on Holy Island in the North Sea. This is considered the start of the Viking Raids
810 – Frisia is attacked by Danish Vikings
855 – Danish Viking army besieges Paris, though never capturing the city
866 – Large Danish Viking army arrives in England
876 – King Alfred cedes East and North England to the Danes thus establishing the Danelaw
911 – Emperor of Western Francia Charles the Simple surrenders what will later be known as Normandy to Viking chief Rollo.
920 – The Danelaw is reconquered by England
982 – London is sacked by Vikings
1013 – "Svend Tveskæg" attacks England and is recognised as the new King of England
1014 - The Battle of Clontarf is fought in the region of Howth, near Dublin between the Irish and Viking forces of Brian Boruma and his Viking and Irish opponents.  The battle results in an Irish victory on the side of king Brian.
1016 – Viking army meets an English army at Ashdon. The battle ends in an English defeat

Early period

1043 – Magnus I of Norway defeats the Wends at Lyrskov Hede
1069 – Sweyn II of Denmark sponsored a successful Danish attack on England in 1069, aiding Anglo-Saxon rebels against William the Conqueror
1157 – 23 October Valdemar I defeats Sven on Grate Hede ending the Danish Civil War
1184 – 21 May A Danish fleet of 125 ships under Absalon defeats a Vendish fleet
1191 – Danish crusade to Finland
1202 – Danish crusade to Finland led by the Archbishop of Lund Anders Sunesen and his brother
1219 – 15 June In the Battle of Lindanise in Estonia (what would later be Livonia), the Danish flag falls down from the sky, at least according to legend (see Dannebrog)
1362 – Valdemar Atterdag defeats a Hanseatic fleet (see Hanseatic League) that was besieging Helsingborg, and forces Lübeck to conclude peace

Union Wars (1434–1523)
1434 – A Swedish peasant rebellion breaks out against the Danes
1448 – Disagreements over who should be the new King after Christoffer the Third's death, leads to war between Denmark and Sweden
1455 – After 7 years of war Danish King Christian the First is recognised as King over the Union
1463 – Another outbreak of rebellion against the Danes in Sweden

1471 – In the Battle of Brunkeberg, the Danes suffer complete defeat at the hands of the Swedish
1472 – Peace is concluded
1497 – 29 September King Hans attempts to grab power in Sweden after internal disturbances. His army of German mercenaries defeats a Swedish army in the Battle of Rotebro and he is recognised as King of Sweden
1500 – 17 February King Hans is defeated in the battle of Dithmarschen
1501 – A Swedish rebellion breaks out and King Hans loses most of Sweden
1501 – The Swedes attack Norway but are forced back. Stockholm surrenders to the Swedes
1510 – Lübeck declares war on Denmark and Sweden joins Lübeck
1511 – 9 August A Danish fleet forces the Lübeck fleet to fall back at Bornholm, and the rest of the war they remain in port
1512 – April Denmark concludes peace with Sweden and Lübeck
1517 – A rebellion in Sweden flares up again. In August a Danish army is deployed at Stockholm, but is defeated at Vedla
1518 – Another Danish army is deployed at Stockholm, but is not capable of forcing a decisive battle
1520 – 6 April A Danish army defeats a Swedish peasant army at Uppsala and occupies Stockholm
1520 – 8 November The Swedish army is defeated. King Christian the Second acquires the title of King of Sweden, and orders all the Swedish nobility executed. This day is known as the bloodbath in Stockholm
1521 – Swedish Gustav Vasa reconquers all of Sweden and the Union is dissolved. Gustav is declared King of Sweden

War with Lübeck and "The Counts Feud" (1534–1537)

1534 – A Civil War named the Count's Feud breaks out. Captain Clement raises a Juttish peasant army
1535 – 9 June A Danish and Swedish fleet fights a naval battle against Lübeck. The battle ends in a draw but in the coming days the Lübeck fleet is destroyed
1536 – 11 June In the Danish Civil War a Danish peasant army is massacred in the battle of Oxnebjerg
1537 – 16 January Lübeck concludes peace with Christian the Third. The Civil War ends when Copenhagen surrenders to Christian the Third

War against The Netherlands (1542–1543)
1542 – War breaks out between France and the German Emperor. Emperor Charles V supports Frederick II, Elector Palatine for the Danish crown, and Denmark participates in the war on the side of France
1543 – Denmark declares war on Netherlands, that are under the rule of Charles
1544 – Denmark concludes the Treaty of Speyer with the German Emperor

Seven Years' War (1563–1570)

1563 – 31 July Ambition and a fight over the right to each other's national weapons, war breaks out between Denmark and Sweden
1563 – 15 September A Danish army moves into Sweden and occupies Älvsborg
1564 – 30 May A Danish fleet under the command of Herluf Trolle, defeats a Swedish fleet between Öland and Gotland
1565 – 9 October The war's only big battle stands at Axtorna. Rantzau defeats a numerically superior Swedish army
1570 – 13 December A peace treaty (Treaty of Stettin) is concluded and terminates the war between Denmark and Sweden. Denmark gives back Älvsborg in return for 150.000 daler (Danish coin)

Kalmar War (1611–1613)

1611 – 4 April War between Denmark and Sweden breaks out when Sweden attempts to break the Danish monopoly on trade with Russia
1611 – 11 June The Swedish Army is defeated at Kalmar
1613 – 20 January Denmark and Sweden sign a peace treaty. Denmark becomes an uncontested power nation in Scandinavia

Thirty Years' War (1618–1648)

1618 – Denmark enters the war between Catholics and Protestants
1626 – The Danish Army under Christian the Fourth is defeated by a Catholic army in the Battle of Lutter am Barenberge
1628 – In the battle of Wolgast, Christian the Fourth is crushed by a German army and forced to conclude peace

Thorsteinson War (1643–1645)

1643 – December: War with Sweden breaks out because of a long dispute over the dominance of the Øresund, and dissent over the Øresund toll.
1643 – 12 December: The Swedish Field Marshal Thorsteinson crosses the border to Holstein from Swedish territory in North Germany.
1644 – January: Jutland is occupied by Swedish troops.
1644 – February: Swedish troops under Gustav Horn advance into Skåne and are stopped at Malmö.
1644 – 16 May: A Danish fleet defeats a Dutch fleet at Lister Dyb, which was sent to reinforce the Swedes.
1644 – 1 July: The Danish Fleet meets the Swedish Fleet at Koldberg Heide. The battle ends in a decisive Danish victory, and the Swedish withdraw to the Kiel Bay.
1644 – 12 October: A combined Swedish and Dutch fleet defeats a Danish fleet at Fehmarn. This effectively decides the outcome of the war.
1645 – February: Peace negotiations are started in Brømsebro.
1645 – 13 August: Denmark and Sweden conclude peace in Brømsebro. Denmark is forced to hand over Gotland, Øsel and Halland (South Sweden) as well as the Norwegian province Jemtland.

Northern Wars (Carl Gustav Krigene) (1657–1660)

Scanian War (Skånske Krig) (1675–1679)

Great Northern War (Store Nordiske Krig) (1700–1720)

Rákóczi's War of Independence (1703-1711)

Russo-Swedish War (1788)

Napoleonic Wars (Napeoleonskrigene) (1800–1813)

Gunboat War (Kanonbådskrigen) (1807–1814)

First War of Schleswig (Treårskrigen / Første Slesvigske Krig) (1848–1850)

Second War of Schleswig (Krigen i 1864 / Anden Slesvigske Krig) (1864)

German Occupation (Den tyske besættelse) (1940–1945)

Operations in Bosnia (1994)

War in Afghanistan (2001–2021)

Invasion of Iraq (2003)

Military intervention in Libya (2011)

See also
 History of Denmark
 Danish Defence

References

Specific

 
History
Military